Jacqueline Afine Toxopeus (born 11 December 1964 in Wageningen, Gelderland) is a former Dutch field hockey international playing in goal. She is undoubtedly one of the finest goalkeepers in Dutch women's field hockey since Det de Beus. Toxopeus, nicknamed Tox, played for several clubs in the Netherlands, but ended her career with HC Den Bosch. In the spring of 2006 she made a short comeback with HC Rotterdam after several injuries in the squad.

References
 KNHB Profile

External links
 

1964 births
Living people
Dutch female field hockey players
Female field hockey goalkeepers
Field hockey players at the 1992 Summer Olympics
Field hockey players at the 1996 Summer Olympics
Medalists at the 1996 Summer Olympics
Olympic bronze medalists for the Netherlands
Olympic field hockey players of the Netherlands
Olympic medalists in field hockey
People from Wageningen
Sportspeople from Gelderland
HC Rotterdam players
HC Den Bosch players